Farouq Qasrawi (12 February 1942 – 10 November 2021) was a Jordanian politician and diplomat. He served as Minister of Foreign Affairs in 2005.

Career
Qasrawi was director of the Jordan Diplomatic Institute and the ambassador of Jordan to Japan and Germany. He was appointed foreign minister of Jordan on 7 April 2005 when a new government was formed. His predecessor was Hani al-Mulki.

Qasrawi then worked as the personal envoy of King Abdullah II. Later, Qasrawi was appointed manager of the personal office of the king, and then a personal advisor to him. In November 2007, Qasrawi was appointed a senator.

References

1942 births
2021 deaths
American University of Beirut alumni
Alumni of the University of London
George Washington University alumni
Members of the Senate of Jordan
Jordanian diplomats
Foreign ministers of Jordan
Ambassadors of Jordan to Germany
Ambassadors of Jordan to Japan
Ambassadors of Jordan to the Philippines
Ambassadors of Jordan to South Korea